Almirante is an Italian surname. Notable people with the surname include:

 Ernesto Almirante (1877–1964), Italian actor
 Giacomo Almirante (1875–1944), Italian actor
 Giorgio Almirante (1914–1988), Italian neo-fascist politician
 Luigi Almirante (1884–1963), Italian actor
 Mario Almirante (1890–1964), Italian film director and screenwriter

Italian-language surnames